Lifkuh (also Romanized as Līfkūh; also known as Līfkū Khandān) is a village in Chubar Rural District, Ahmadsargurab District, Shaft County, Gilan Province, Iran. At the 2006 census, its population was 571, in 142 families.

References 

Populated places in Shaft County